Euschistus tristigmus, the dusky stink bug, is a species of stink bug in the family Pentatomidae. It is found in Central America and North America.

Subspecies
There are two subspecies of Euschistus tristigmus: 
 Euschistus tristigmus luridus Dallas, 1851 i c g b (dusky stink bug)
 Euschistus tristigmus tristigmus Say, 1832 i c g b
Data sources: i = ITIS, c = Catalogue of Life, g = GBIF, b = Bugguide.net

References

External links

 

Pentatomini
Hemiptera of Central America
Hemiptera of North America
Taxa named by Thomas Say
Insects described in 1832
Articles created by Qbugbot